Mountcrest University College is a private co-ed tertiary institution in Ghana.

References

Universities in Ghana
Educational institutions established in 2008
2008 establishments in Ghana